Thomas Worsley Staniforth (7 June 1845 – 25 March 1909) was a British hymn writer.

Life
Thomas was born in Sheffield, England to Thomas Staniforth, a Grinder and Cordelia Worsley. His family lived in the Wicker area of the city. Prior to becoming interested in music, Thomas worked as an Accounting clerk. By the time of the 1871 Census he had relocated to Brighton and is described as an Organist. Thomas primarily worked at St Paul's Church, Brighton as Organist and Choirmaster and later moved onto a position as music master at Highgate School in London.

On 27 February 1872 his hymn O Thou Our Souls was chosen to be performed at St. Paul's Cathedral during a thanksgiving service for the recover of then Prince of Wales Edward VII. Other notable hymns composed by Staniforth include Jerusalem my happy home and St Paul He was also a regular contributor to the Sheffield Telegraph for whom he wrote articles on church history and music.

Towards the end of the century he retired back to Sheffield. On 5 October 1898 he married Sarah Susannah Nicholson (Denton), a widower at the Wicker Parish church. He died on 25 March 1909 and was buried on 29 March 1909 at City Road Cemetery.

References

1845 births
1909 deaths
Writers from Sheffield
Church of England hymnwriters